The Puerto Rican racer (Borikenophis prymnus) is a species of snake in the family Colubridae. The species is endemic to the island of Puerto Rico.

References

.

Borikenophis
Reptiles of Puerto Rico
Reptiles described in 1966